Waytapallana (Quechua wayta wild flower, a little bunch of flowers, pallay to collect, pallana an instrument to collect fruit / collectable, Waytapallana "a place where you collect wild flowers", hispanicized spelling Huaytapallana) is a mountain in the Andes of Peru, about  high. It is situated in the Junín Region, Huancayo Province, Pariahuanca District. Waytapallana lies on the left bank of the Lampa River, east of the Waytapallana mountain range. The village of Aychana lies at its feet.

References 

Mountains of Peru
Mountains of Junín Region